Ghostdini: Wizard of Poetry in Emerald City is the eighth studio album by American rapper and Wu-Tang Clan-member Ghostface Killah, released September 29, 2009 on Def Jam Recordings in the United States. He first announced the album in a May 2008 interview, describing it as an R&B-inspired album, similar to his previous work with such artists as Ne-Yo and Jodeci. The album spawned four singles; "Baby", a slow-tempo R&B song with auto-tune vocals by Raheem "Radio" DeVaughn, "Forever", "Let's Stop Playin'" featuring John Legend, and "Guest House", featuring Fabolous & Shareefa. Upon its release, Ghostdini: Wizard of Poetry in Emerald City received generally positive reviews from music critics. As of December 12, 2009, the album has sold 64,000 copies in the United States.

Reception
Ghostdini: Wizard of Poetry in Emerald City received positive reviews from most music critics. At Metacritic, which assigns a normalized rating out of 100 to reviews from mainstream critics, the album received an average score of 68, based on 13 reviews, which indicates "generally favorable reviews". AllMusic editor David Jeffries gave it three-and-a-half out of five stars and called the album an "oversexed, always fun, and occasionally hilarious effort", commenting that "Nasty as he wants to be, Ghostdini is nothing more than the Face and friends having a good time. The results are as improper as they are infectious". The Smoking Section wrote that "makes its mark as Ghostface’s most idealistic album furthering its distinction against Ghost’s previously renowned offerings". Delusions of Adequacy's Bryan Sanchez commented that "Forever flourishing, there is so much to love about an album as playfully awesome as this one". Time Out writer Jesse Serwer gave it four out of five stars and complimented Ghostface Killah's "risqué approach" to R&B, calling the album "unique among efforts by rappers to reach into such territory: It’s in no way soft".

However, Larry Fitzmaurice of Tiny Mix Tapes gave it one-and-a-half out of five stars and disliked the album's subject matter, stating "as an album, it’s complete shit, but at least there are a few tracks to listen to when you’re driving". Jon Dolan of Spin gave the album a seven out of 10 rating and wrote favorably of Ghostface Killah's lyrics, stating "Even the raw stuff has the humanizing detail that keeps Ghost interesting years after we've grown accustomed to his imagesplaying Joycean flow". In his consumer guide for MSN Music, critic Robert Christgau gave the album an A− rating.  Christgau commended Ghostface's "potentially ridiculous switch to love man" and commented that "rhymewise, this is original work. Eschewing oily sexual details, luxury purchases, and vows of generalized devotion, Ghost mines the same kind of specifics that juice his gangsta repertoire".

Track listing

 "Stapleton Sex" was excluded from the album's censored version.

Sample credits
"Not Your Average Girl" contains elements of "Drowning in the Sea of Love" performed by Joe Simon, and excerpts from "Theme From the Planets" performed by Dexter Wansel
"Do Over" contains excerpts from "You Can't Stop My Love" performed by Norman Feels
"Lonely" contains samples of "Lonesome Lonely & Alone" performed by Love Peace & Happiness
"Baby" contains samples of "Grasshoppers" performed by Ryuichi Sakamoto
"Stay" contains samples of "Stay A Little Longer" performed by Yvonne Fair
"Guest House" contains samples of "El Jardia" performed by Johnny Pate
"Let's Stop Playin'" contains samples of "Inner City Blues (Make Me Wanna Holler)" performed by Marvin Gaye
"Forever" contains elements of "We'll Always Be Together" performed by The Whatnauts
"Goner" contains elements of "Watching You" 
"Back Like That" contains a sample of "Baby Come Home" performed by Willie Hutch, and an interpolation of "Song Cry" performed by Jay-Z

Personnel 
Credits for Ghostdini: Wizard of Poetry in Emerald City adapted from Allmusic.

 Anthony "Acid" Caputo – Engineer, Mixing, Producer 
 Ed "Wolverine" Goldson – Bass, Guitar, Keyboards 
 Brian Herman – Engineer 
 Ken Ifill – Mixing 
 Scram Jones – Producer 
 Justice League – Producer 
 Jack Knight – Vocals (Background) 
 James Lewis – Bass, Guitar 
 Mela Machinko – Vocals (Background) 

 Bei Maejor – Producer 
 Mahogany – Producer 
 Shareefa – Vocals 
 Skymark – Engineer, Producer 
 Rashad Smith – Engineer 
 Mike Tocci – Engineer 
 Doug Wilson – Engineer 
 Kristen Yiengst – Photography 
 Jordan "DJ Swivel" Young – Engineer

Charts

References

External links
 Ghostdini: Wizard of Poetry in Emerald City at Discogs
 Ghostdini: Wizard of Poetry in Emerald City at Metacritic

2009 albums
Ghostface Killah albums
Def Jam Recordings albums
Albums produced by Scram Jones
Albums produced by Grind Music
Albums produced by J.U.S.T.I.C.E. League
Albums produced by Maejor